Eubranchus agrius is a species of minute sea slug or nudibranch, a marine gastropod mollusc in the family Eubranchidae. It is an aeolid nudibranch, which is thought to occur in New Zealand and Chile.

Distribution
This species was described from Chile. It has been reported from New Zealand.

References

Eubranchidae
Gastropods of New Zealand
Gastropods described in 1959